Herbert Raine Curlewis (22 August 1869 – 11 October 1942) was an Australian judge and writer.

Early life and education
Curlewis  was born in Bondi, New South Wales and was the eldest son of Frederick Charles Curlewis, a brickmaster, and his wife Georgina Sophia, née O'Brien. He attended Newington College commencing in 1881. In 1885 and again in 1886, he won the Wigram Allen Scholarship, endowed by Sir George Wigram Allen, for Classics. At the end of 1886 Curlewis was named Dux of the College and received the Schofield Scholarship. He went up to the University of Sydney and in 1890 graduated as a Bachelor of Arts and in 1892 LL.B. He later lectured in law at the university.

Marriage and family
On 22 April 1896 he married Ethel Turner, the author of Seven Little Australians and they had two children, Jean and Adrian (later Sir Adrian).

Publications
As a student Curlewis showed literary talent and in 1906 he wrote The Mirror of Justice, a layman's introduction to the legal process. He was also editor of the Australasian Annual Digest. Other publications held by the National Library of Australia include:
Comparative tables showing the English laws and statutes in force in New South Wales, and the English statutes corresponding to New South Wales enactments (Sydney: 1904) Law Book Company of Australasia
Pleading at common law in New South Wales : being notes of lectures delivered in the Law School of the University of Sydney / by Herbert Curlewis revised by David Edwards (Sydney: 1921) Law School of the University of Sydney, 1921
Procedure at common law and in the inferior courts: being notes of lectures delivered in the Law School of the University of Sydney / by Herbert Curlewis revised by David Edwards (Sydney: 1929) Published for the Law School of the University of Sydney
Introduction to the law of evidence (Sydney: 1940) University of Sydney

Legal career
He was admitted to the Bar in 1893 and practised in common law. In 1917 he was appointed an additional judge of the Court of Industrial Arbitration of New South Wales. Following the abolition of that court in 1926, he was appointed a judge of the NSW District Court in 1928. Curlewis retired in 1939 and died in 1942.

References

 

1869 births
1942 deaths
20th-century Australian judges
People educated at Newington College
University of Sydney alumni
Judges of the District Court of NSW